Phan Huy Lê (Thạch Châu, Lộc Hà district, Hà Tĩnh province, 23 February 1934 – 23 June 2018) was a Vietnamese historian and professor of history at the Hanoi National University. 

He authored of many studies on village society, landholding patterns and peasant revolution in particular, and in Vietnamese history in general. 

Phan was director of the Center for Vietnamese and Intercultural Studies at Vietnam National University, Hanoi.

Phan belonged to the school of historians, including also Trần Quốc Vượng distinguishing 'Vietnamese-ness' without relation to Chinese influences.

References

1934 births
2018 deaths
20th-century Vietnamese historians
People from Hà Tĩnh province
21st-century Vietnamese historians
Academic staff of Vietnam National University, Hanoi